Arbuckle Island is a small island on the Arkansas River in Sebastian County, Arkansas, United States. It was named for Matthew Arbuckle Jr., a career soldier who once owned the island. The island was granted to him as part of more than  that he obtained at the end of his military career.

References

Landforms of Sebastian County, Arkansas
Islands of Arkansas